Carina Raich (born 14 March 1979 in Arzl im Pitztal) is an Austrian former alpine skier who competed in the 2002 Winter Olympics, but like all her teammates she didn't finish the special slalom.

Carina is the sister of Benjamin Raich but she retired very early (in the year 2005) because she was constantly injured. Since 2008, she is married to Mario Stecher.

External links
 sports-reference.com

1979 births
Living people
Austrian female alpine skiers
Olympic alpine skiers of Austria
Alpine skiers at the 2002 Winter Olympics
People from Imst District
Sportspeople from Tyrol (state)